Helena Gerarda Catharina "Lenie" Lanting-Keller  (4 April 1925 – 2 September 1995) was a Dutch diver. She competed at the 1952 Summer Olympics in the 3 m springboard and finished in 14th place.

References

1925 births
1995 deaths
Olympic divers of the Netherlands
Divers at the 1952 Summer Olympics
Dutch female divers
20th-century Dutch women